North Bend may refer to:

Places
Canada
North Bend, British Columbia, Canada

United States
North Bend, Nebraska 
North Bend, Ohio
North Bend, Oregon
North Bend, Washington
North Bend, West Virginia
North Bend, Wisconsin, a town
North Bend (community), Wisconsin, an unincorporated community
North Bend Rail Trail, West Virginia, US
North Bend State Park, West Virginia, US
North Bend Township, Starke County, Indiana
North Bend (Oscar, Louisiana), listed on the National Register of Historic Places (NRHP) in Louisiana
North Bend (Weyanoke, Virginia), NRHP-listed

Other uses
 The North Bend, an album by Rafael Anton Irisarri, 2010